A total number of sixteen teams (eight men, eight women) competed at the Basketball Competition during the 2007 Pan American Games held in Rio de Janeiro, Brazil.

Men's competition

Facundo Sucatzky
Diego García
Gabriel Mikulas
Diego Logrippo
Luis Cequeira

Matías Sandes
Román González
Martin Leiva
Patricio Prato
Javier Bulfoni

Leonardo Mainoldi
Mariano Byro
Head coach:Gonzalo García

Marcelo Machado
Welington dos Santos
Murilo da Rosa
Marcus Reis
Marcelinho Huertas

Valter da Silva
Alex Garcia
Guilherme Teichmann
Caio Torres
J. P. Batista

Marcus Vinicius
Paulão Prestes
Head coach:Aluisio Ferrerira

Osvaldo Jeanty
Jermaine Anderson
Ryan Bell
Paul Larmand
Sheray Thomas

Rans Brempong
Andy Rautins
Aaron Doornekamp
Jesse Wade Young
Jermaine Bucknor

Sean Denison
Vlad Kuljanin
Head coach:Leo Rautins

Joel Muñoz
Jair Jamel Peralta
Danilo Pinnock
Maximiliano Gómez Torres
Jamaal Levy

Jorsua Chambers
Reyjavick Degracia
Eduardo Isaac
Dionisio Gomez
Joel Isaac Tesis

José Lloreda
Desmond Smith
Head coach:Vincente Duncan

Peter John Ramos
José Juan Barea
Ansel Guzmán
Miguel Berdiel
Joel Martin Jones

Alejandro Carmona
Gabriel Colon
Ricardo Sanchez
Angelo Reyes
Héctor Velenzuela

Carmelo Lee
Manuel Narvaez
Head coach:Manuel Cintron Vega

Fernando Martínez
Emilio Taboada
Mauricio Aguiar
Panchi Barrera
Nicolás Mazzarino

Claudio Charquero
Leandro García
Martín Osimani
Gastón Paez
Juan Pablo Silveira

Sebastián Izaguirre
Esteban Batista
Head coach:Alberto Espasandin

Joey Dorsey
Wayne Ellington
Shan Foster
James Gist
Roy Hibbert

Maarty Leunen
Derrick Low
Eric Maynor
Drew Neitzel
Scottie Reynolds

Kyle Weaver
D.J. White
Head coach:Jay Wright (Villanova University)

Steven Hodge
Kevin Sheppard
Carl Krauser
Cuthbert Victor
Jameel Heywood

Jason Edwin
Darnell Miller
Kaylen Gregory
Akeem Francis
Carl Thomas

Kitwana Rhymer
Frank Elegar
Head coach:Tevester Anderson

Women's competition

Constanza Landra
Marina Cava
Paula Gatti
Marcela Paoletta
Celeste Cabañez

Florencia Fernández
Alejandra Fernández
Anastasia Saenz
Sandra Pavón
Laura Nicolini

Valentina Maggi
Alejandra Chesta
Head coach:—

Janeth Arcain
Graziane Coelho
Tatiana Conceição
Jucimara Dantas ("Mamá")
Patricia Ferreira ("Chuca")

Micaela Jacinto
Palmira Marçal
Isis Nascimento
Adriana Moisés Pinto
Karen Rocha

Kelly Santos
Soeli Zakrzeski ("Êga")
Head coach:—

Jordan Adams
Kelsey Adrian
Uzo Asagawara
Chelsea Aubry
Amanda Brown

Devon Campbell
Sarah Crooks
Gabriele Kleindienst
Lizanne Murphy
Tamara Tatham

Sheila Townsend
Carrie Watson
Head coach:Alison McNeill

Yaneth Arias
Luisa Atehortua
Elena Díaz
Laura Estrada
Mabel Martínez

Nancy Mesa
Glency Mosquera
Tathiana Mosquera
Monica Palacios
Yenny Pinilla

Heissy Robledo
Levis Torres
Head coach:—

Yamara Amargo
Suchitel Avila
Yayma Boulet
Cariola Echevarría
Oyanaisis Gelis

Yamilé Martínez
Clenia Noblet
Leidys Oquendo
Yaquelín Plutín
Arlenys Romero

Yolyseny Soria
Taimara Suero
Head coach:Alberto Zabala

Rashida Aikens
Kimberly Bennett
Latoya Byfield
Simone Edwards
Vanessa Gidden

Simone Jackson
Nicole Louden
Antoinette Messam
Oberon Pitterson
Rebecca Richman

Sharon Wiles
Demoya Williams
Head coach:—

Jennifer Arriola
Veronica Carmona
Alejandra Delgado
Abril Selene García
Erika Gomez

Fernanda Gutierrez
Lourdes Machuca
Taine Ramírez
Sandra Ramos
Zazil Salman

Brisa Silva
Melendez Villavicencio
Head coach:—

Mattee Ajavon
Nicky Anosike
Jayne Appel
Marissa Coleman
Emily Fox

Alexis Hornbuckle
Charde Houston
Natasha Humphrey
Erlana Larkins
Angel McCoughtry

Melanie Thomas
Candice Wiggins
Head coach:Dawn Staley

References
Rosters
USA Basketball

2007
Basketball squads at the Pan American Games